Haplogroup R0 (formerly known as haplogroup pre-HV) is a human mitochondrial DNA (mtDNA) haplogroup.

Origin
Haplogroup R0 derives from the macro-haplogroup R. It is an ancestral clade to the R0a subclade and haplogroup HV, and is therefore antecedent to the haplogroups H and V.

R0's greater subclade variety in the Arabian Peninsula suggests that the clade originated in and spread from there.

R0a is believed to have evolved in Ice Age oases in South Arabia around 22,000 years ago. The subclade would then have spread from there with the onset of the Late Glacial period circa 15,000 ybp.

Distribution
Haplogroup R0 has been found in around 55% of osteological remains belonging to the Eneolithic Trypillia culture.

The R0 clade has also been found among Iberomaurusian specimens at the Taforalt and Afalou prehistoric sites, which date from the Epipaleolithic. Among the Taforalt individuals, around 17% of the observed haplotypes belonged to various R0 subclades, including R0a1a (3/24; 13%) and R0a2c (1/24; 4%). Among the Afalou individuals, one R0a1a haplotype was detected (1/9; 11%).

R0 has likewise been observed among mummies excavated at the Abusir el-Meleq archaeological site in Middle Egypt, which date from the Pre-Ptolemaic/late New Kingdom, Ptolemaic, and Roman periods.

The 3rd century AD Catholic Church Saint, Fortunato of Serracapriola, was also found to carry the R0a'b subclade.

R0 today occurs commonly in the Arabian peninsula, with its highest frequency observed nearby among the Soqotri (40.7%). The Soqotri also have the greatest R0 subclade diversity. The clade is likewise found at high frequencies among the Kalash in South Asia (23%). Additionally, moderate frequencies of R0 occur in Northeast Africa, Anatolia, the Iranian Plateau and Dalmatia. The haplogroup has been observed among Chad Arabs (19%), Sudanese Copts (13.8%), Tigrais (13.6%), Somalis (13.3%), Oromos (13.3%), Afar (12.5%), Amhara (11.5%), Gurage (10%), Reguibate Sahrawi (9.26%; 0.93% R0a and 8.33% R0a1a), Gaalien (9%), Beja (8.3%), Nubians (8%), Arakien (5.9%), Yemenis (5.1–27.7%), Iraqis (4.8%), Druze (4.3%), Palestinians (4%), Algerians (1.67%), and Saudis (0–25%).

Subclades

Tree

This phylogenetic tree of haplogroup R0 subclades is based on the paper by Mannis van Oven and Manfred Kayser Updated comprehensive phylogenetic tree of global human mitochondrial DNA variation and subsequent published research.

R
R0 (or pre-HV)
R0a'b – Albania
R0a (or (pre-HV)1)
R0a1 or (pre-HV)1a
R0a1a – Saudi Arabia, Yemen, Qatar, Bahrain, Kuwait, Lebanon, Italy
R0a1a1 – Yemen, Tunisia
R0a1a1a – Yemen (Socotra)
R0a1a2 – Ethiopia
R0a1a3
R0a1a4 – Saudi Arabia, Qatar, Kuwait, Iraq
R0a1-T152C! – Morocco, Spain
R0a1b – Arabia
R0a-60.1T – Italy, Armenians of Turkey, Kalash of Pakistan
R0a2'3 – Iran, Lebanon
R0a2 or (pre-HV)1b
R0a2a – Portugal, Spain, Italy
R0a2a1 – Italy, Algeria
R0a2b – Ethiopia
R0a2c – Saudi Arabia, Qatar, Kuwait, Yemenite Jews
R0a2d
R0a2e
R0a2f – Arabs from Chad, United Arab Emirates, Saudi Arabia
R0a2f1
R0a2f1a – Oman, Saudi Arabia, Yemen
R0a2f1b – Yemen, United Arab Emirates
R0a2g
R0a2g1
R0a2g1a
R0a2g1a1 – Saho of Eritrea, Amhara of Ethiopia
R0a2h – United Arab Emirates
R0a2h1 – Afar of Eritrea
R0a2i – Yemen
R0a2-T195C! – Saudi Arabia
R0a2j – Yemen, Oman, United Arab Emirates
R0a2k – Sardinia
R0a2k1 – Saudi Arabia, Yemen
R0a2l – Yemen
R0a2m – Ashkenazi Jews, Xueta of Spain, Gitanos of Spain, Mexico, Ecuador Morocco
R0a2n – Druze of Lebanon, Assyrians, Italy, Balti of Pakistan
R0a2q – Oromo of Kenya, Saho of Eritrea
R0a2r – Southern Europe (Romania, Bulgaria), Druze
R0a3 – Yemen, Persians
R0a3a – Lebanon, Yemen
R0a4 – Spain, Portugal, Ashkenazi Jews, Iraq
R0b – Italy, Azerbaijan
HV
HV0
HV0a
V
H

See also 

Genealogical DNA test
Genetic genealogy
Human mitochondrial genetics
Population genetics

References

External links 
General
Ian Logan's Mitochondrial DNA Site
Mannis van Oven's PhyloTree
Haplogroup R0
Spread of Haplogroup pre-HV, from National Geographic

R0
South Arabia